Liberty Bridge may refer to:
Ponte della Libertà in Venice
Liberty Bridge (Bay City, Michigan)
Liberty Bridge (Budapest)
Liberty Bridge at Falls Park on the Reedy in Greenville, South Carolina
Liberty Bridge (Novi Sad)
Liberty Bridge (Pittsburgh)
Liberty Bridge, Zagreb, the first divided highway bridge in Zagreb, Croatia
The original proposal for the Verrazano-Narrows Bridge in New York City, referred to as the "Liberty Bridge"